David Nitschmann der Bischof (David Nitschmann the Bishop, December 18, 1695/96, Suchdol nad Odrou, Moravia – October 8, 1772, Bethlehem, Pennsylvania) was with Johann Leonhard Dober one of the two first missionaries of the Moravian Brethren in the West Indies in 1732, and the first Bishop of the Renewed Unitas Fratrum, the Moravian Church.

Life
In 1735 in Berlin, he was consecrated the first Bishop of the Renewed Unitas Fratrum, Moravians by Daniel Ernst Jablonski, Grandson of John Amos Comenius, the last Bishop of the Ancient Unitas Fratrum.

He landed at Philadelphia, in 1741 and was instrumental in the founding of Bethlehem, Pennsylvania where he died in 1772.

Nitschmann traveled with John Wesley and helped to found the mission at Bethlehem.

References

External links
(Papers of David Nitschmann (Bishop) (PDF)

The Moravians in Georgia, Chapter 6
https://web.archive.org/web/20091027152737/http://www.geocities.com/janet_ariciu/Linebaugh.html

1695 births
1772 deaths
18th-century Moravian bishops
Moravian Church missionaries
Czech people of the Moravian Church
German Protestant missionaries
Moravian-German people
Protestant missionaries in the United States Virgin Islands
People from Suchdol nad Odrou